La Lavia was a Venetian merchantman. She was a class of ship known as a carrack often used as merchant ships due to their capacious holds. She was requisitioned at Lisbon for service in the Spanish armada of 1588. She was wrecked on 22 September on the coast of Cairbre, now county Sligo in northwest Ireland, along with two other ships, La Juliana and Santa Maria de Vison.

Armada service
She was the Almiranta, or Vice Flagship of the Levantine Squadron . She also had on board the Judge Advocate General of the armada, Martin de Aranda. He was ultimately responsible for dispensing justice and therefore was in charge of discipline for the fleet. His staff consisted of a chief
assistant, a licentiate named Magaña, four notaries, six military police, a jailer and six guards.

It was to this ship that the Spanish officer Francisco de Cuellar was transferred for judgement after being sentenced to death by courts martial for breach of discipline after the battle of Gravelines in the English channel. The Judge Advocate declined to carry out the sentence on de Cuellar, saving his life. De Cuellar later wrote an account of his adventures.

Wreck
The wreck-site of the Lavia was discovered in 1985 by an English salvage crew off the north Sligo coast at Streedagh strand. The wreck is protected under the National Monuments (Amendment) Acts 1987 and 1994. Monitoring and excavation are ongoing at the site.

References

Carracks